Vieux Yakhya Sané (born 4 August 1989) is a Senegalese professional footballer who last played as a defender for Brann. He has previously played for Tromsø, Bodø/Glimt, Stade Brest, Bursaspor (only cup games), Auxerre and Oostende.

Club career
Sané was born in Dakar, and moved to Tromsø in 2011. Before the 2012 season he signed a contract with Bodø/Glimt and made his debut in 3–3 draw against Bærum.

After four seasons with Bodø/Glimt, Sané moved to France, signing a six-month contract, with the option of an additional year, with Ligue 2 side Stade Brestois 29.

Career statistics

References

External links
 

1989 births
Living people
Senegalese footballers
Association football defenders
Tromsø IL players
FK Bodø/Glimt players
Stade Brestois 29 players
Bursaspor footballers
AJ Auxerre players
K.V. Oostende players
SK Brann players
Eliteserien players
Norwegian First Division players
Ligue 2 players
Belgian Pro League players
Senegalese expatriate footballers
Expatriate footballers in Norway
Expatriate footballers in Turkey
Expatriate footballers in France
Expatriate footballers in Belgium
Senegalese expatriate sportspeople in Norway
Senegalese expatriate sportspeople in Turkey
Senegalese expatriate sportspeople in France
Senegalese expatriate sportspeople in Belgium